Tremblay is a former commune in the Ille-et-Vilaine department of Brittany in northwestern France. On 1 January 2019, it was merged into the new commune Val-Couesnon.

The botanist René Louiche Desfontaines (1750–1833) was born near Tremblay.

Population
Inhabitants of Tremblay are called in French tremblaisiens.

See also
Communes of the Ille-et-Vilaine department

References

External links

Former communes of Ille-et-Vilaine